San Sepolcro is a church in central Parma.

History
A church on the site is first mentioned in documents from 1275, likely built at the site of a prior structure. The present building was begun in 1506, attributed to work of Bartolomeo Pradesoli and Jacopo di Modena, but the nave was not completed in its present Neoclassic style until the 1700s. The 1616 bell-tower is attributed to the architects Malosso or Simone Moschino. The top was not added till 1753. The wooden ceiling was carved between 1613 and 1617 by Lorenzo Zaniboni and Giacomo Trioli. The canvases of various saints in the interior are attributed to the studio of Lionello Spada. The stations of the Via Crucis were sculpted by  Giuseppe Carra.

Adjacent to the church is the former monastery of the Canons Regular of the Lateran, who officiated at the church from 1257 till 1798, when the order was suppressed. The monastery has a Renaissance cloister designed by Ziliolo da Reggio, the capitals of the columns were sculpted by Antonio Ferrari d'Agrate. In 1566, the monastery received the title of Abbey. The monastery now belongs to the Dominican order.

References

16th-century Roman Catholic church buildings in Italy
17th-century Roman Catholic church buildings in Italy
Buildings and structures completed in 1616
Towers completed in the 17th century
Sepolcro
1616 establishments in Italy